The 2011 Danish Figure Skating Championships was held in Aarhus from December 2 through 5, 2010. Skaters competed in the disciplines of men's singles, ladies' singles, and ice dancing on the levels of senior, junior, novice, and the pre-novice levels of debs, springs, and cubs. The results were used to choose the teams to the 2011 World Championships, the 2011 European Championships, the 2011 Nordic Championships, and the 2011 World Junior Championships.

Senior results

Men

Ladies

Ice dancing

External links
 2011 Danish Championships results
 DM 2011
 Dansk Skøjte Union

2011
2010 in figure skating
2011 in figure skating
Figure Skating Championships,2011